Lilian Thirza Charlotte Holt (1898–1983) was a British artist, also known by her married name, Bomberg. She was a founding member of the Borough Group. Her dedication to her partner and family limited her career and opportunities as an artist.

Biography
The daughter of Oliver Oswald Holt, a civil servant, Holt studied at Putney Art School and took evening classes at Regent Street Polytechnic. In 1914, she started work with the Post Office in London as a telephonist, and served in the Women's Land Army during World War I. Her first marriage, to London art dealer Jacob Mendelson, and the birth of her daughter Dinora Mendelson (herself an artist, married at one time to Leslie Marr) limited her opportunities to paint during the 1920s but she studied the work of Walter Sickert, Jacob Epstein, Jacob Kramer, and David Bomberg during this time. She married Bomberg after visiting him in Spain in 1929. Holt did not resume painting until 1945, focusing instead on supporting Bomberg's career. While Bomberg was teaching at the Borough Polytechnic Institute, Holt was a founding member of the Borough Group, a collective of painters influenced by Bomberg, and participated in group exhibitions. Holt and Bomberg moved to Ronda in Spain from 1954 to 1957, before returning to England due to Bomberg's failing health. After Bomberg's death, Holt focused on her own work, traveling to, often remote areas of, Mexico, Basutoland, Andalusia, Yugoslavia, Morocco, Turkey, and Iceland to paint, as well as continuing to promote Bomberg's legacy.

Exhibitions and collections 
Exhibitions of Holt's work include Paintings and Drawings by David Bomberg (1890-1957) and Lilian Holt (1971) at the Reading Museum and Art Gallery and her first solo exhibition, Lilian Holt: Paintings and Drawings (1980) at the Ben Uri Gallery, when she was in her seventies. Posthumous exhibitions include the 1992 group exhibition Ten Decades: Careers of Ten Women Artists Born 1897-1906 at the Norwich Gallery and the 1985 solo exhibition A Tribute to Lilian Bomberg at Fischer Fine Art in London.

Holt's painting Tajo, Ronda (1956) is in the permanent collection of the Tate Gallery. She is also the subject of several paintings by Bomberg, including Lilian (1932) and Lilian Painting David (Painting Lilian) (1929).

References

External links 

1898 births
1983 deaths
20th-century English painters
20th-century English women artists
Alumni of the University of Westminster
Artists from London
Borough Group
English women painters